Koli National Park is a national park in the municipalities of Joensuu, Lieksa and Kontiolahti in the North Karelia region of Finland. The park was established in 1991 and is currently governed by the Metsähallitus. It was originally governed by the Finnish Forest Research Institute, which is also called the Metla.

Koli National Park preserves the traditional agricultural heritage of the area. The park was once a pagan sacrificial site, and was later used for slash-and-burn agriculture. While fields in the park are no longer slashed and burned, hay is cut yearly and traditional Finnish breeds of cow and sheep graze in the meadows of Koli.

According to central protection objectives, Koli National Park is divided into three main zones.

Stringent attention is paid to the natural landscape and geological aspects of the mountaintop zone of Koli. In this culture zone, a variety of traditional landscapes is maintained through burn-beating, grazing, and rotating open fields, among other methods. In particular, the multiform flora of open fields needs annual mowing to be preserved.

In the nature zone is the forest landscape of the hills, which are also protected. Koli's terrain varies widely, allowing for many different biotopes in a small area and a great variety of species. The rocky terrain is relatively rugged but contains dense plant growth.

Attractions
The most well-known vantage point in the park is Ukko-Koli, which has a grand view to the east over Pielinen Lake. The Heritage Center Ukko and Hotel Koli are situated near the point. Two long scenic lifts operate here during the summer.

Koli has inspired many painters and composers, such as Jean Sibelius, Juhani Aho and Eero Järnefelt. Järnefelt painted a large landscape scene with A.W. Finch and Ilmari Aalto in 1911. This painting can be seen in the Helsinki railway station restaurant. Painters discovered Koli in the 19th century, and it has been called one of the best natural scenes in Finland.

There are two ski resorts in the Koli area: Loma-Koli for families and Ukko-Koli for more advanced downhill skiers. There are three ski lifts and six ski slopes in Ukko-Koli. There are four ski lifts and six ski slopes in Loma-Koli. Two of the slopes are for snowboarding. There are also snow castles for children.

See also 
 List of national parks of Finland
 Protected areas of Finland

References

External links 

 Koli National Park - Official Site
 Outdoors.fi – Koli National Park
 Koli National Park webpage
 Video about travelling in the Koli area - by students from Koli area
 Video about downhill skiing in Koli - by students from Koli area

Ski areas and resorts in Finland
Protected areas established in 1991
Kontiolahti
Lieksa
Joensuu
Geography of North Karelia
Tourist attractions in North Karelia
1991 establishments in Finland
National parks of Finland